Eumetriochroa is a genus of moths in the family Gracillariidae.

Etymology
The name is derived from the Greek eu (meaning original, primitive), metrios (meaning moderate, temperate) and chroa (skin, colour of skin).

Species
Eumetriochroa araliella Kobayashi, Huang & Hirowatari, 2013
Eumetriochroa hederae Kumata, 1998  
Eumetriochroa hiranoi Kumata, 1998  
Eumetriochroa kalopanacis Kumata, 1998  
Eumetriochroa miyatai Kumata, 1998

References

External links
Global Taxonomic Database of Gracillariidae (Lepidoptera)

Phyllocnistinae
Gracillarioidea genera